Ylander is a Nordic surname. Notable people with the surname include:

Katri Ylander (born 1985), Finnish singer
Katri Ylander (album), her debut album
Lars Ylander (1928–2010), Swedish sprinter

Surnames of Scandinavian origin